Márcio Luis Marques Guimarães or simply Márcio Guerreiro (born March 6, 1981, in Nova Iguaçu), is a Brazilian right-sided midfielder. He currently plays for Villa Nova-MG on loan from Cruzeiro.

Márcio Guerreiro has played for Villa Nova-MG and Ipatinga in the Copa do Brasil.

Honours
Rio de Janeiro State League (2nd division): 2004

Contract
Villa Nova-MG (Loan) 1 January 2008 to 15 May 2008
Cruzeiro 6 April 2006 to 5 April 2009
Nova iguaçu  Encerrou a carreira em 17/12/2013.

References

http://globoesporte.globo.com/rj/serra-lagos-norte/noticia/2013/12/marcio-guerreiro-ex-fla-e-ponte-preta-encerra-carreira-no-nova-iguacu.html

External links
 CBF

 2009

1981 births
Living people
Brazilian footballers
Nova Iguaçu Futebol Clube players
Associação Atlética Portuguesa (RJ) players
Volta Redonda FC players
CR Flamengo footballers
Ipatinga Futebol Clube players
Cruzeiro Esporte Clube players
Villa Nova Atlético Clube players
Associação Atlética Ponte Preta players
Association football midfielders
People from Nova Iguaçu
Sportspeople from Rio de Janeiro (state)